Scott Herndon is an American politician serving as a Republican member of the Idaho Senate from the 1st district. Herndon assumed office on December 1, 2022, after defeating incumbent Jim Woodward in the Republican primary and independent candidate Steve Johnson in the November Senate election.

Herndon is a born again Christian. In January 2023, he introduced legislation to eliminate marriage licenses and instead directed officiants to issue marriage certificates following a ceremony between "two qualified people, a man, and a woman". Representative Ilana Rubel said the bill appears to codify that "there would only be marriage recognized between a man and a woman" in Idaho, which would violate Obergefell v. Hodges, the U.S. Supreme Court case guaranteeing same-sex marriage in the United States. He advocates for "restrain[t] encroachments on individual liberty from all levels of civil government". He opposes abortion.

References

Place of birth missing (living people)
Living people
Republican Party Idaho state senators
21st-century American politicians
Arizona State University alumni
Politicians from Richmond, Virginia
Year of birth missing (living people)